Capys connexivus, the African protea butterfly, is a butterfly in the family Lycaenidae. It is found in Tanzania, Malawi, Zambia, Angola and Zimbabwe.

Adults are on wing year-round, with a peak from August to November.

The larvae feed on Protea gaguedi and Protea angolensis.

Subspecies
Capys connexivus connexivus (western Tanzania, Malawi, northern and central Zambia, Angola, western and northern Zimbabwe)
Capys connexivus gardineri Henning & Henning, 1988 (Zambia: Mufulira area)

References

Butterflies described in 1897
Capys (butterfly)
Butterflies of Africa
Taxa named by Arthur Gardiner Butler